Carl Friedrich Claus  (born 9 November 1827 in Kassel; died 29 August 1900 in London) was a German chemist and inventor. He patented the Claus process.

Life 
Claus studied chemistry at University of Marburg in Germany. He emigrated to England, where he worked as chemist. A British patent for the Claus process was issued to him in 1883. The Claus process is the most significant gas desulfurizing process, recovering elemental sulfur from gaseous hydrogen sulfide. The process was later significantly modified by German company IG Farben His first wife was Mary Claus (born Brown). She died in Wiesbaden, Germany, on 25 April 1880 at the age of almost 55. She had been living in Wiesbaden at least since 1878, and her daughters Elizabeth and Pauline have been with her at least since 1880/81, all three in Paulinenstraße Nr. 6. On 14 June 1900 the widower Claus, age 72, married in Hammersmith in the county of London his second wife, the spinster Caroline Barry. Claus died as a rich man in London in 1900.

External links 
 Researchgate.net: Carl Friedrich Claus

References 

19th-century German chemists
19th-century German inventors
University of Marburg alumni
1827 births
1900 deaths
Scientists from Kassel